Sir James Bruton (1848 – 26 February 1933) was an English politician. He was elected member of Parliament for Gloucester for the Unionist Party in 1918 and 1922.

James Bruton was born in Newent, Gloucestershire, in 1848, the son of the auctioneer Henry Bruton. He was the elder brother of Henry Bruton junior (1843–1920). He was educated at The Crypt School in Gloucester.

He was knighted in 1916.

References 

1848 births
1933 deaths
Members of Parliament for Gloucester
People from Newent
James
People educated at The Crypt School, Gloucester
Conservative Party (UK) MPs for English constituencies
UK MPs 1918–1922
UK MPs 1922–1923